Margaret Ocran is a Ghanaian politician and educationist. She was a member of parliament for the Amanano Constituency.

Career 
Prior to entering politics, Ocran was an educationist. She taught at the Kumasi Government Girls' School and later became the headmistress of Yaa Achia Middle Girls' School in Kumasi. In 1965, she was made a member of parliament for the Amanano Constituency. She remained in this position until 24 February 1966 when the Nkrumah government was overthrown.

References 

Ghanaian politicians
Year of birth missing (living people)
Living people
Place of birth missing (living people)